The University of Dongola (in Arabic جامعة دنقلا), is a public university located in Dongola Sudan. UofD has a standing relationship and has conducted conferences with Horseed International University, based in Mogadishu, Somalia.

References

Universities and colleges in Sudan
Northern (state)